Hallwood may refer to:

Places 

Hallwood, Cheshire, England
Hallwood, Virginia, USA

People 

 Joe Hallwood, (born 1969), English TEFL teacher
 Charles Hallwood, Scottish footballer